Brockbridge Correctional Facility was a minimum security prison operated by the Maryland Department of Public Safety and Correctional Services in Jessup, Maryland. The facility closed in 2019.

Prisoners
Prisoners at Brockbridge have done beach cleanup after storms hit Maryland. In 2011, Brockbridge had a comedy night for the facility's talent night. Ministers from St. Francis of Assisi Parish in Fulton, Maryland visit Brockbridge.

Security
In 2009, Brockbridge began using the BOSS, or Body Orifice Security Scanner, chair to find contraband.

Notable incidents
In 2010, a fight broke out that injured several inmates. In 2012, a Brockbridge Officer was accused of living a double life. In 2007, an inmate was assaulted by a officer at Brockbridge.

Notable inmates
Princeton Simmons, brother of Todd Gurley

References

Jessup, Maryland
Government buildings in Maryland
Men's prisons
Defunct prisons in Maryland
1966 establishments in Maryland